Martin Davis was the defending champion, but lost in the third round this year.

Vijay Amritraj won the title, defeating Henri Leconte 7–6, 1–6, 8–6 in the final.

Seeds

Draw

Finals

Top half

Section 1

Section 2

Bottom half

Section 3

Section 4

External links
 Main draw

1986 Grand Prix (tennis)
1986 Bristol Open